= California rule =

American legal doctrine

The California Rule is a legal doctrine requiring that government workers throughout the state of California receive the pension benefits that were in place on the day they were hired, and that those benefits cannot be reduced (though they can be increased); meaning that mandatory employee contributions cannot be increased, nor can cost-of-living allowances be decreased, not even for not-yet-earned benefits. It treats government employee pensions as contracts protected by state's Constitution.

It is followed by twelve states in total, equalling about 25% of the US population.
